Campodea majorica is a species of two-pronged bristletail in the family Campodeidae.

Subspecies
These three subspecies belong to the species Campodea majorica:
 Campodea majorica interjecta Conde, 1954 g
 Campodea majorica majorica Conde, 1954 g
 Campodea majorica sicula Conde, 1957 g
Data sources: i = ITIS, c = Catalogue of Life, g = GBIF, b = Bugguide.net

References

Further reading

 
 
 
 
 
 
 
 

Diplura
Animals described in 1954